Pannawit Thongnuam (born 24 December 1995) is a Thai male badminton player. He plays in the men's singles. He won his first international title at the 2017 Smiling Fish International tournament. At the Taipei Universiade, he won two bronze medals in the men's singles and team event. He also was the runner-up at the 2015 Mexico City Grand Prix.

Achievement

Summer Universiade 
Men's singles

BWF Grand Prix 
The BWF Grand Prix has two level such as Grand Prix and Grand Prix Gold. It is a series of badminton tournaments, sanctioned by Badminton World Federation (BWF) since 2007.

Men's singles

 BWF Grand Prix Gold tournament
 BWF Grand Prix tournament

BWF International Challenge/Series
Men's singles

 BWF International Challenge tournament
 BWF International Series tournament

References

External links 
 

Living people
1995 births
Pannawit Thongnuam
Universiade medalists in badminton
Universiade bronze medalists for Thailand
Badminton players at the 2018 Asian Games
Pannawit Thongnuam
Medalists at the 2017 Summer Universiade
Pannawit Thongnuam